Katukurunda Airport ( Katukurunda Guwanthotupala) is a domestic airport located near the town of Kalutara in Sri Lanka. It is also a military airbase known as Sri Lanka Air Force Katukurunda or SLAF Katukurunda.

History
Originally established as the Royal Naval Air Station HMS Ukussa, it was reactivated in 1984 by the Sri Lanka Air Force. It has been the venue for many motor races conducted in association with the Air Force Sports Board and with Sports Ministry approval.

Established in 1944 by the Fleet Air Arm of the Royal Navy at its peak it was the largest Royal Naval Air Station, staffed by 300 Officers, 3000 sailors and 100 women from the Women's Royal Naval Service. It serviced more than 100 aircraft at any given time whilst maintaining an aircraft repair yard.

Local civil flying schools provide flight training facilities from the aerodrome.

Airlines and destinations

References

Airports in Sri Lanka
Sri Lanka Air Force bases